Albrecht Wenzel Eusebius von Wallenstein (24 September 1583 – 25 February 1634), also von Waldstein, was a Bohemian military leader and statesman who fought on the Catholic side during the Thirty Years' War (1618–1648). His successful martial career made him one of the richest and most influential men in the Holy Roman Empire by the time of his death. Wallenstein became the supreme commander of the armies of the Imperial Army of Holy Roman Emperor Ferdinand II and was a major figure of the Thirty Years' War.

Wallenstein was born in the Kingdom of Bohemia into a poor Protestant noble family. He acquired a multilingual university education across Europe and converted to Catholicism in 1606. A marriage in 1609 to the wealthy widow of a Bohemian landowner gave him access to considerable estates and wealth after her death at an early age in 1614. 
Three years later, Wallenstein embarked on a career as a mercenary by raising forces for the Holy Roman Emperor in the Uskok War against the Republic of Venice.

Wallenstein fought for the Catholics in the Protestant Bohemian Revolt of 1618 and was awarded estates confiscated from the rebels after their defeat at White Mountain in 1620. A series of military victories against the Protestants raised Wallenstein's reputation in the Imperial court and in 1625 he raised a large army of 50,000 men to further the Imperial cause. A year later, he administered a crushing defeat to the Protestants at Dessau Bridge. For his successes, Wallenstein became an Imperial count palatine and made himself ruler of the lands of the Duchy of Friedland in northern Bohemia.

An imperial generalissimo by land, and Admiral of the Baltic Sea from 21 April 1628, Wallenstein found himself released from service in 1630 after Ferdinand grew wary of his ambition. Several Protestant victories over Catholic armies induced Ferdinand to recall Wallenstein (Gollersdorf April 1632), who then defeated the Swedish king Gustavus Adolphus at Alte Veste. The Swedish king was later killed at the Battle of Lützen. Wallenstein realised the war could last decades and, during the summer of 1633, arranged a series of armistices to negotiate peace. These proved to be his undoing as plotters accused him of treachery and Emperor Ferdinand II ordered his assassination. Dissatisfied with the Emperor's treatment of him, Wallenstein considered allying with the Protestants. However, he was assassinated at Eger in Bohemia by one of the army's officials, with the emperor's approval.

Early life
Wallenstein was born on 24 September 1583 in Heřmanice, Bohemia, which is the easternmost and largest region in what was then the Holy Roman Empire, in the present-day Czech Republic, into a poor Protestant Wallenstein branch of the Waldstein family who owned Heřmanice Castle and seven surrounding villages. His mother, Markéta Smiřická of Smiřice, died in 1593; his father, Vilém, died in 1595.

They had raised him bilingually – the father spoke German while his mother preferred Czech – yet Wallenstein in his childhood had a better command of Czech than of German. His parents' religious affiliations were Lutheranism and Utraquist Hussitism.
After their deaths, Albrecht for two years lived with his maternal uncle Heinrich (Jindřich) Slavata of Chlum and Košumberk, a member of the Unity of the Brethren (Bohemian Brethren), and adopted his uncle's religious affiliation. His uncle sent him to the brethren's school at Košumberk Castle in Eastern Bohemia.

In 1597, Albrecht was sent to the Protestant Latin school at Goldberg (now Złotoryja) in Silesia, where the then-German environment led him to hone his German language skills. While German became Wallenstein's main language, he is said to have continued to curse in Czech. On 29 August 1599, Wallenstein continued his education at the Protestant University of Altdorf near Nuremberg, Franconia, where he was often engaged in brawls and épée fights, leading to his imprisonment in the town prison. He beat his servant so badly he had to purchase him a new suit of clothes on top of paying compensation.

In February 1600, Albrecht left Altdorf and travelled around the Holy Roman Empire, France and Italy, where he studied at the universities of Bologna and Padua. By this time, Wallenstein was fluent in German, Czech, Latin and Italian, was able to understand Spanish, and spoke some French.

Wallenstein then joined the army of the Emperor Rudolf II in Hungary, where, under the command of Giorgio Basta, he saw two years of armed service (1604–1606) in the Long Turkish War against the Ottoman Turks and Hungarian rebels.
 
In 1604, his sister, Kateřina Anna, married the leader of the Moravian Protestants, Karel the Older of Zierotin. He then studied at the University of Olomouc (matriculating in 1606). His contact with the Olomouc Jesuits is considered to be at least partially responsible for his conversion to Catholicism that same year.

The contributory factor to his conversion may have been the Counter-Reformation policy of the Habsburgs that effectively barred Protestants from being appointed to higher offices at court in Bohemia and in Moravia, and the impressions he gathered in Catholic Italy. However, there are no sources clearly indicating the reasons for Wallenstein's conversion, except for a subjunctive anecdote by his contemporary Franz Christoph von Khevenhüller about the Virgin Mary saving Wallenstein's life when he fell from a window in Innsbruck. Wallenstein was later made a member of the Order of the Golden Fleece.

In 1607, based on recommendations by his brother-in-law, Zierotin, and another relative, Adam of Waldstein, often mistakenly referred to as his uncle, Wallenstein was made chamberlain at the court of Matthias, and later also chamberlain to archdukes Ferdinand and Maximilian.

In 1609, Wallenstein married the Czech Lucretia of Víckov, née Nekšová, of Landek, the wealthy widow of Arkleb of Víckov who owned the towns of Vsetín, Lukov, Rymice and Všetuly/Holešov (all in eastern Moravia). She was three years older than Wallenstein, and he inherited her estates after her death in 1614.

He used his wealth to win favour, offering and commanding 200 horses for Archduke Ferdinand of Styria for his war with Venice in 1617, thereby relieving the fortress of Gradisca from the Venetian siege. He later endowed a monastery in his late wife's name and had her reburied there.

In 1623, Wallenstein married Isabella Katharina, daughter of Count Karl von Harrach. She bore him two children: a son who died in infancy and a surviving daughter. Examples of the couple's correspondence survive. The two marriages made him one of the wealthiest men in the Bohemian Crown.

Thirty Years' War

The Thirty Years' War began in 1618 when the estates of Bohemia rebelled against Ferdinand of Styria and elected Frederick V of the Palatinate, the leader of the Protestant Union, as their new king. Wallenstein associated himself with the cause of the Catholics and the Habsburg dynasty.

In the summer of 1618, Count Jindřich Matyáš Thurn led 10,000 troops into Moravia to secure their loyalty to the rebellion. Nobles who wished for a rapprochement with Ferdinand faced a choice. Senior nobleman Zierotin's son-in-law, Georg von Nachod, commanded the Moravian cavalry and his brother-in-law, Wallenstein, the infantry. Both decided to take their regiment into Austria. Nachod's troops rebelled and he fled for his life. Wallenstein's major demanded authorisation from the Estates upon which Wallenstein drew his sword and ran him through,"A fresh major was immediately appointed and displayed greater tractability".  Deserting the Bohemians, he marched his regiment to Vienna taking with him the Moravian treasury. There, however, the authorities told him that the money would go back to the Moravians – but he had shown his loyalty to Ferdinand, the future Emperor.

Wallenstein equipped a regiment of cuirassiers and won great distinction under Charles Bonaventure de Longueval, Count of Bucquoy in the wars against Ernst von Mansfeld and Gabriel Bethlen (both supporters of the Bohemian revolt) in Moravia. Wallenstein recovered his lands (which the rebels had seized in 1619) and after the Battle of White Mountain (8 November 1620), he secured the estates belonging to his mother's family and confiscated tracts of Protestant lands.

He grouped his new possessions into a territory called Friedland (Frýdlant) in northern Bohemia.  A series of successes in battle led to Wallenstein becoming in 1622 an imperial count palatine, in 1623 a prince, and in 1625 Duke of Friedland. Wallenstein proved an able administrator of the duchy and sent a large representation to Prague to emphasize his nobility.

In order to aid Ferdinand (elected Holy Roman Emperor in 1619) against the Northern Protestants and to produce a balance in the army of the Catholic League under Johann Tserclaes, Count of Tilly, Wallenstein offered to raise a whole army for the imperial service following the bellum se ipsum alet principle, and received his final commission on 25 July 1625. Wallenstein's successes as a military commander brought him fiscal credit, which in turn enabled him to receive loans to buy lands, many of them being the former estates of conquered Bohemian nobles. He used his credit to grant loans to Ferdinand II, which were repaid through lands and titles. Wallenstein's popularity soon recruited 30,000 (not long afterwards 50,000) men. The two armies worked together over 1625–27, at first against Mansfeld.

Having beaten Mansfeld at Dessau (25 April 1626), Wallenstein cleared Silesia of the remnants of Mansfeld's army in 1627. His army ravaged and burned down many Silesian towns and villages, including Prudnik, Głogówek, Żory, Pszczyna, Bytom, Rybnik, Koźle, and Strzelce Opolskie.

At this time he bought from the emperor the Duchy of Sagan (in Silesia). He then joined Tilly in the struggle against Christian IV of Denmark, and afterwards gained as a reward the Duchies of Mecklenburg, whose hereditary dukes suffered expulsion for having helped the Danish king. This awarding of a major territory to someone of the lower nobility shocked the high-born rulers of many other German states.

Wallenstein assumed the title of "Admiral of the North and Baltic Seas". However, in 1628 he failed to capture Stralsund, which resisted the Capitulation of Franzburg and the subsequent siege with assistance of Danish, Scottish and Swedish troops, a blow that denied him access to the Baltic and the chance to challenge the naval power of the Scandinavian kingdoms and of the Netherlands.

Although he succeeded in defeating Christian IV of Denmark in the Battle of Wolgast and neutralizing Denmark in the subsequent Peace of Lübeck, the situation further deteriorated when the presence of Imperial Catholic troops on the Baltic and the Emperor's "Edict of Restitution" brought King Gustavus Adolphus of Sweden into the conflict. Wallenstein attempted to aid the forces of the Polish–Lithuanian Commonwealth under Hetman Stanisław Koniecpolski, which were fighting Sweden in 1629. However, Wallenstein failed to engage any major Swedish forces and this significantly affected the outcome of the conflict.

Over the course of the war Wallenstein's ambitions and the abuses of his forces had earned him a host of enemies, both Catholic and Protestant, princes and non-princes alike. Ferdinand suspected Wallenstein of planning a coup to take control of the Holy Roman Empire. The Emperor's advisors advocated dismissing him, and in September 1630 envoys were sent to Wallenstein to announce his dismissal. The decision was taken at Regensburg on 13 August 1630 on the following day Wallenstein's financier De Witte committed suicide (having accrued a mountain of debt financing Wallenstein).

Wallenstein gave over his army to General Tilly and retired to Jičín, the capital of his Duchy of Friedland. There he lived in an atmosphere of "mysterious magnificence".

However, circumstances forced Ferdinand to recall Wallenstein into the field. The successes of Gustavus Adolphus over General Tilly at the Battle of Breitenfeld and the Lech (1632), where Tilly was killed, and his advance to Munich and occupation of Bohemia, required a vigorous response. It was during this time that Wallenstein had taken inspiration from the reforms of Gustavus Adolphus, instituting harsh discipline by providing rewards for bravery and punishment for disorder, thievery, and cowardice and with this in mind Wallenstein raised a fresh army within a few weeks and took to the field. He drove the Saxon army from Bohemia and then advanced against Gustavus Adolphus, whom he opposed near Nuremberg and, after the Battle of the Alte Veste, dislodged. In November, the great Battle of Lützen was fought, in which Wallenstein was forced to retreat but, in the confused melee, Gustavus Adolphus was killed. Wallenstein withdrew to winter quarters in Bohemia.

In the campaigning of 1633, Wallenstein's apparent unwillingness to attack the enemy caused much concern in Vienna and in Spain. At this time the dimensions of the war had grown more European, and Wallenstein had begun preparing to desert the Emperor. He expressed anger at Ferdinand's refusal to revoke the Edict of Restitution. Historic records tell little about his secret negotiations but some sources  indicated he was preparing to force a "just peace" on the Emperor "in the interests of united Germany". With this apparent "plan" he entered into negotiations with Saxony, Brandenburg, Sweden, and France. Apparently the Habsburgs' enemies tried to draw him to their side. In any case, he gained little support. Anxious to make his power felt, he resumed the offensive against the Swedes and Saxons, winning his last victory at Steinau on the Oder in October. He then resumed negotiations.

Assassination

In December, Wallenstein retired with his army to Bohemia, around Pilsen (now Plzeň). Vienna soon definitely convinced itself of his treachery, a secret court found him guilty, and the Emperor looked seriously for a means of getting rid of him (a successor in command, the later emperor Ferdinand III, was already waiting). Wallenstein was aware of the plan to replace him, but felt confident that when the army came to decide between him and the Emperor the decision would be in his favour.

On 24 January 1634 the Emperor signed a secret patent (shown only to certain officers of Wallenstein's army) removing him from his command. Finally an open patent charging Wallenstein with high treason was signed on 18 February and published in Prague.

In the patent, Ferdinand II ordered Wallenstein brought under arrest to Vienna, dead or alive.

Losing the support of his army, Wallenstein now realized the extent of his peril, and on 23 February with a company of some hundred men, he went from Plzeň to Cheb, hoping to meet the Swedes under Prince Bernard.

After his arrival at Cheb, however, certain senior Scottish and Irish officers in his force assassinated him on the night of February 25. To carry out the assassination, a regiment of dragoons under the command of an Irish colonel, Walter Butler and the Scots colonels Walter Leslie and John Gordon first attacked Wallenstein's trusted officers (Adam Trczka, Vilém Kinský, Christian von Ilow, and Henry Neumann), while they attended a feast at Cheb Castle, to which the officers had been invited by Gordon himself. 

According to historian, A. E. J. Hollaender, quoting the "holograph account" of Denis MacDonell, aka Dionysius Macdaniel, Irish Captain of Colonel Butler's regiment and participant in the events, Captain Walter Devereux with twelve dragoons and Sergeant Major Geraldine with eight burst into the room from two doors, surprising the feasting guests. Geraldine cried out Vivat Ferdinandus Imperator ("Long live Emperor Ferdinand") with MacDonell responding with Et tota Domus Austriaca ("And the whole House of Austria"). By another account, as quoted in Peter H. Wilson's work on the Thirty Years' War, the conspirators entered the room shouting "Who is a good Imperialist?". All of Wallenstein's loyal officers present were massacred. Trczka alone managed to fight his way out into the courtyard, only to be shot down by a group of musketeers.

A few hours later, Devereux, together with a few companions, broke into the burgomaster's house at the main square where Wallenstein had been lodging, and kicked open the bedroom door. Wallenstein, roused from sleep and unarmed, is said to have asked for quarter but Devereux ran his spear through Wallenstein killing him. The Emperor rewarded the assassins.

In 1784, his descendant Vincenc von Wallenstein had the remains of the general and his wife transported from the Carthusian monastery in Valdice, after the monastery was abolished in 1782 by Emperor Joseph II, to St. Anne's Chapel in the town of Mnichovo Hradiště, in the Czech Republic.

Obsession with horoscopes
While a student at Padua, Wallenstein had followed the lessons of the prominent astrologer Andrea Argoli, who had also initiated him into the mysteries of the Kabbalah.

During his stay in Prague in 1625, Wallenstein had the imperial court mathematician Johannes Kepler issue his first horoscope. This was customary at the time, and anyone who was wealthy and influential often had one. After a brief warning not to trust the stars alone, Kepler wrote that his client
had a busy, restless mind who strove for new, untried or strange means. The horoscope characterized Wallenstein as a person with great ambition who strove for power.
Dangerous enemies may challenge him, but he would mostly win.
Wallenstein would continue to be dependent on horoscopes for the next several years prior to his death in 1634.

Chronic illness
Wallenstein began to suffer joint inflammation in the feet in 1620. It was believed to be a case of gout, or by excessive drinking. His condition deteriorated rapidly.

In November 1629 he became so ill that he lay down for weeks. In March 1630 he traveled to Karlovy Vary (Karlsbad) to seek relief. He found it difficult to walk. At the Battle of Lützen in November 1632, he mounted his horse in extreme pain. Half a year later he was no longer able to ride. On his flight to Eger in 1634 he had to be moved around in a wagon or lying in a transport litter.

In the 1970s the skeleton of Wallenstein was examined. The inner core of the leg bones showed abnormal changes that suggest terminal syphilis.

Legacy

The Czech National Museum produced a large exhibition about Wallenstein at the Wallenstein Palace in Prague (current seat of Senate) from 15 November 2007 to 15 February 2008. He is also the subject of Calderón de la Barca's play El prodigio de alemania and Schiller's play trilogy Wallenstein.

Wallenstein is a main figure in Alfred Döblin's eponymous novel.

Friedrich Schiller was fascinated by Wallenstein, and produced three plays on the subject: "Wallenstein's Camp," "The Piccolomini," and "Wallenstein's Death." Wallenstein appears only in the latter two.

Composer Bedřich Smetana honored Wallenstein in his 1859 symphonic poem Wallenstein's Camp, which was originally intended as an overture to a play by Schiller.

Josef Rheinberger composed a symphonic tone painting Wallenstein in 1866. The work in four movements is also called a symphony. It was premiered in Munich on 26 November 1866.

Composer Vincent d'Indy honored Wallenstein in his 1871 symphonic triptych Wallenstein.

Wallenstein is examined by economist Arthur Salz in his book Wallenstein als Merkantilist (Wallenstein as Mercantilist).

Ancestry

Notes

References

Sources
 Cristini, Luca. 1618–1648 la guerra dei 30 anni. Volume 1 da 1618 al 1632 2007  and Volume 2 da 1632 al 1648 2007 
 
 Mann, Golo. Wallenstein, his life narrated, 1976, Holt, Rinehart and Winston.

External links

 
 
 
 The Thirty-Years-War
 An Exhibition at Prague, Czech Republic, Europe – Dedicated to Albrecht von Wallenstein
 
 "Wallenstein: Generalissimo" from Military Heritage magazine
 Albrecht von Wallenstein – In spite of envy

 
Rulers of Mecklenburg
Dukes of Żagań
Bohemian people of the Thirty Years' War
Field marshals of the Holy Roman Empire
1583 births
1634 deaths
Bohemian nobility
Generalissimos
Knights of the Golden Fleece
Palacký University Olomouc alumni
University of Altdorf alumni
Assassinated military personnel
Converts to Roman Catholicism from Lutheranism
People from Náchod District
Albrecht
17th-century German military personnel
Czech military leaders
17th-century Bohemian people
Military personnel of the Thirty Years' War